The Land Before Time is an American animated film series and media franchise created by Judy Freudberg and Tony Geiss, distributed by Universal Pictures and centered on dinosaurs. The series began in 1988 with the eponymous The Land Before Time, directed and produced by Don Bluth and executive produced by George Lucas and Steven Spielberg. It was followed by 13 direct-to-video musical sequels, a TV series, video games, soundtracks, and related merchandising. Neither the sequels nor the series involve the participation of Bluth, Lucas, or Spielberg. All 14 films were released as a Complete Collection DVD set on June 14, 2016.

Plot 
The films follow a friendship of a group of young ornithodirans (four dinosaurs and a pterosaur) named Littlefoot (Apatosaurus), Cera (Triceratops), Ducky (Saurolophus), Petrie (Pteranodon), and Spike (Stegosaurus). After finding the Great Valley, they raise a carnivorous baby, (a Tyrannosaurus, whom they name Chomper), survive a drought and a cold snap, and witness a solar eclipse. Throughout all the films, they embark upon adventures, learning lessons about life and friendship along the way.

List of titles

Films 
The following is a list of the 14 films in the series.

Albums 
 The Land Before Time (1990) Original Motion Picture Soundtrack 
 The Land Before Time: Sing-Along Songs (1997) Songs from The Land Before Time, II, III & IV
 The Songs from The Land Before Time (1997) Songs from The Land Before Time, II, III & IV
 The Land Before Time: More Sing-Along Songs (1999) Songs from The Land Before Time V & VI and An American Tail III & IV
 The Best Songs from The Land Before Time (2016) Songs from The Land Before Time, VI, VIII, IX, X, XI & XIV

Television series 

A television series based on the films began airing on YTV in Canada on January 5, 2007. It consisted of one season of 26 episodes, and officially premiered on Cartoon Network in the United States on March 5, 2007, after the DVD release of The Land Before Time XII: The Great Day of the Flyers. The TV series takes place after the events of The Land Before Time XIII: The Wisdom of Friends. It has since been collected and released on 6 DVDs, each containing 4 episodes, in the United States and the UK.

Games 

The series has spawned 14 spin-off games, eight for PC, one for the Game Boy Color, two for the Game Boy Advance and three for the original PlayStation. The PC games are usually educational games aimed for preschool and kindergarten. Games for the Game Boy Color and Advance include The Land Before Time and The Land Before Time: Into the Mysterious Beyond, in which the original six characters must search for Chomper. Games for the PlayStation include The Land Before Time: Big Water Adventure, a spin-off of Journey to Big Water, The Land Before Time: Great Valley Racing Adventure and The Land Before Time: Return to the Great Valley. All characters in these games are voiced by Lani Minella.

Cast and characters

References

External links 
 Official The Land Before Time YouTube account

 
Film series introduced in 1988
Fiction about dinosaurs
Animated film series
Universal Pictures franchises
Adventure film series
Films adapted into television shows
1980s English-language films
1990s English-language films
2000s English-language films
2010s English-language films